Duvernay is a last name of French origin:

It can refer to:

People
Devin Duvernay (born 1997), American football player
Ludger Duvernay, a Canadian publisher
Pauline Duvernay, a 19th-century French dancer
Ava DuVernay, an American filmmaker and marketer

Places
 Duvernay, Quebec, a former city, now a district of Laval, Quebec, Canada
 Duvernay, Alberta, a hamlet